Malshiras Assembly constituency (254)  is one of the 288 Vidhan Sabha (legislative assembly) constituencies of Maharashtra state in western India. It is reserved for Scheduled Caste.

Overview
Malshiras (constituency number 254) is one of the eleven Vidhan Sabha constituencies located in the Solapur district. It covers the entire Malshiras tehsil of this district. The number of electors in 2009 was 271422 (male  140224, female 131198).

Malshiras is part of the Madha Lok Sabha constituency along with five other Vidhan Sabha segments, namely- Madha, Sangole and  Malshiras in the Solapur district and Phaltan and Maan in the Satara district.

Member's of Legislative Assembly

Election Results

2019

See also
 Karmala
 Politics of Maharashtra
Politics in India

References

Akluj
Assembly constituencies of Solapur district
Assembly constituencies of Maharashtra